The Kuwait national under-20 football team is the youth association football team representing Kuwait in youth competitions and it is controlled by Kuwait Football Association.

Results
AFC U-20 Asian Cup

Results and fixtures

See also
 Kuwait national football team 
 Kuwait national under-23 football team
 Kuwait women's national football team

u20
Asian national under-20 association football teams